Naja is a genus of snakes commonly referred to as cobras.

Naja may also refer to:
 Robert Del Naja (born 1965), British artist, musician, and founding member of Massive Attack
 Naja Marie Aidt (born 1963), Danish poet and writer
 Najas, a genus of aquatic plants
 Naha, Chiapas, a natural preserve and Mayan village.
 Naja - the pendant on a Navajo Squash Blossom necklace. See Native American jewelry.

Na'ja refers to:
 Na'ja, Saudi Arabia, located south of the mountain of Hadhn ("Jebel Hadhn"), to the southeast of Mecca

NAJA may refer to:
Law Enforcement Force of Islamic Republic of Iran
Native American Journalists Association

See also 
Naga (disambiguation)